Elena Becker-Barroso is a Spanish molecular biologist and the editor in chief of Lancet Neurology.

Education 
Becker-Barroso obtained a bachelor's degree in life sciences from the University of Exeter in 1997 and has a PhD in molecular biology from the University of Salamanca.

She undertook postdoctoral research at the Skirball Institute of Biomolecular Medicine at New York University, and has a diploma in science communication from Birkbeck University.

Career 
Becker-Barroso joined in the editorial department of Lancet Neurology in 2005 before becoming the editor-in-chief of in 2012.

Selected publications 

 Becker-Barroso, E. (2009, January 1). For neurologists in Cuba, hope is not embargoed. LANCET NEUROLOGY, 8(12), 1088–1089.

Awards 
Becker-Barroso has an honorary degree from the University of Exeter.

References

External links 

 

Living people
Academic journal editors
Spanish molecular biologists
Alumni of the University of Exeter
New York University alumni
Year of birth missing (living people)
Spanish women scientists